Big Time is a Smokey Robinson soundtrack album released on June 28, 1977. It was arranged by Ronnie McNeir and Sonny Burke with Melvin "Wah Wah" Watson credited for guitar.

Track listing
"Theme from Big Time"	9:31
"J.J.'s Theme"	0:35
"Hip Trip"	4:46
"He is the Light of the World"	2:11
"So Nice to be with You"	6:29
"Shana's Theme" with dialogue	0:13
"If We're Gonna Act Like Lovers"	5:19
"The Agony and the Ecstasy"	2:34
"Theme from Big Time (Reprise)" 2:20

References

Also on Guitar Marv Tarplin/
On Keyboards  Sonny Burke

External links

Smokey Robinson albums
Albums produced by Smokey Robinson
1977 soundtrack albums
Motown soundtracks
Comedy film soundtracks